Herpetogramma junctalis is a moth in the family Crambidae. It was described by Harrison Gray Dyar Jr. in 1910. It is found in Veracruz, Mexico.

References

Moths described in 1910
Herpetogramma
Moths of Central America